South Gloucestershire is a unitary authority area in the ceremonial county of Gloucestershire, South West England. Towns in the area include Yate, Chipping Sodbury, Thornbury, Filton, Patchway and Bradley Stoke, the latter three forming part of the northern Bristol suburbs. The unitary authority also covers many outlying villages and hamlets. The southern part of its area falls within the Greater Bristol urban area surrounding the city of Bristol.

South Gloucestershire was created in 1996 to replace the Northavon district of the abolished county of Avon. It is separate from Gloucestershire County Council, but is part of the ceremonial county and shares Gloucestershire's Lord Lieutenant (the Sovereign's representative to the county). Because of its history as part of the county of Avon, South Gloucestershire works closely with the other unitary authorities that took over when that county was abolished, including shared services such as Avon Fire and Rescue Service and Avon and Somerset Police, together with co-operation in planning strategy for transport, roads and housing.

History
Prior to the implementation of the Local Government Act 1972 on 1 April 1974, the area that now forms South Gloucestershire formed part of the shire county of Gloucestershire, comprising the urban districts of Kingswood and Mangotsfield and the Rural Districts of Warmley, Sodbury and Thornbury. However, under the terms of that act, the area was removed from Gloucestershire, and became part of the county of Avon, forming the districts of Kingswood and Northavon.

In 1996, the county of Avon was abolished, and South Gloucestershire was created as a unitary authority area comprising the former districts of Kingswood and Northavon. The area borders the city and county of Bristol, the Bath and North East Somerset unitary authority area, and the shire counties of Gloucestershire and Wiltshire.

The geographic area currently known as South Gloucestershire should not be confused with Southern Gloucestershire. Nor should organisations or bodies in the past titled 'South Gloucestershire' (meaning Southern Gloucestershire) be confused with the area covered by the unitary authority.

Demographic
At the 2001 census, the population of South Gloucestershire was 245,641.

At the 2011 census, the population had increased to 262,767.

At the 2021 census, the population estimate for South Gloucestershire is 290,400.

According to the 2001 census estimates, 97.6 percent of the population was described as white, 0.8 percent as dual heritage, 0.7 percent as Asian or Asian British, 0.4 percent as Black or Black British and 0.5 percent as Chinese or other.

Much of the population is in towns that form the 'suburbs' to the north and east of Bristol. There are also the large towns of Yate and its neighbour Chipping Sodbury, Thornbury, the large villages of Winterbourne and Frampton Cotterell, Wickwar, Alveston, Olveston and Tockington.

Economy

The main employers are the local authority with 9,500 people and the Ministry of Defence Headquarters for Defence Procurement and the Naval Support Command with 7,000 employees. Other key employers include Airbus, Rolls-Royce and the Royal Mail, which dominates the Filton-Patchway area of South Gloucestershire. Friends Provident and Hewlett Packard also have major offices in nearby Stoke Gifford.

Many employers operate in the heavily developed area between the northern edge of Bristol and the M5 motorway, an area sometimes described as the North Fringe of Bristol. This includes the Cribbs Causeway shopping centre, comprising The Mall regional shopping centre and the surrounding retail parks. East of Patchway are the Aztec West and Almondsbury business parks either side of the A38, extending to Bradley Stoke and the M4/M5 Almondsbury Interchange. Employers with sites in this area include EE and the RAC.

Education

South Gloucestershire is home to 99 primary schools, 16 secondary schools, and post-16 colleges and centres. There is one university, the University of the West of England, which was a former polytechnic. In 2008, DCSF figures revealed that there was a 6.6% overall absence in the district's secondary schools, whilst 7.4% is the national average.

In 2005, the then Chancellor of the Exchequer recognised the City of Bristol's ties to science and technology by naming it one of six "science cities", and promising funding for further development of science in the city, with a £300 million science park planned at Emerson's Green, in South Gloucestershire.

Geography
The River Severn forms the north-western edge of the area, with a wide coastal plain terminated by an escarpment. East of this is the wide River Frome Valley drainage area. Further east is another escarpment running roughly north–south, passing between Yate and Chipping Sodbury and west of Pucklechurch. The Cotswolds Escarpment forms the eastern edge of South Gloucestershire, while the western half is mainly urbanised.

A small part of the Cotswolds and the National Trust site of Dyrham Park are also in the district. South of the motorways are suburbs of Bristol while areas north are rural. Some of the inner green belts have been taken away by developments like the new town of Bradley Stoke.

Transport

South Gloucestershire is a major transport hub with many areas of South Gloucestershire having easy commuting access to Bristol (via A38 and M32), Bath to the east, as well as westward to South Wales and Cardiff via the two Severn bridges. The M5 and M4 motorways provide access to Gloucester and London. Bristol's northern and eastern ring road, the A4174, passes through South Gloucestershire.

This network of roads is of paramount importance to the industries and distribution centres in the area, as well as to the regional shopping centres – which give it a prime location.

South Gloucestershire is working with the City and County of Bristol in developing a large Metrobus system.

The area also has an important and well used railway network, with many direct routes to towns and cities across the UK. This includes eastward to London and westward through the Severn Tunnel to Cardiff and the rest of South Wales. There are also routes down to the South-West counties and north to England's second city, Birmingham. Many routes cross in Stoke Gifford at the Bristol Parkway railway station. There are six stations within the district, mainly located near the border with Bristol in the west of the district.

South Gloucestershire is home to the eastern ends of the two Severn Bridges, which are the main arterial routes by road to and from South Wales.

Settlements

Kingswood 40,734
Bradley Stoke 27,805
Yate 27,603
Thornbury 12,342
Stoke Gifford 11,509
Patchway 10,465
Filton 9,861

Other towns and villages
Abson, Acton Turville, Almondsbury, Alveston, Aust, Awkley
Badminton, Bagstone, Beach, Bitton, Bridgeyate
Cadbury Heath, Catbrain, Charfield, Cheswick, Charlton (former village), Charlton Hayes, Chipping Sodbury, Churchend, Coalpit Heath, Codrington, Cold Ashton, Compton Greenfield, Conham, Cowhill, Cromhall
Dodington, Downend, Doynton, Duckhole, Dunkirk, Dyrham
Earthcott, Easter Compton, Elberton, Emersons Green, Engine Common
Falfield, Frampton Cotterell, Frenchay
Gaunt's Earthcott
Hallen, Hambrook, Hanham, Harry Stoke, Hawkesbury, Hawkesbury Upton, Hill, Hinton, Horton
Ingst, Iron Acton, Itchington
Latteridge, Little Badminton, Little Sodbury, Little Stoke, Littleton-upon-Severn, Longwell Green
Mangotsfield, Marshfield, Milbury Heath, Upper and Lower Morton
Nibley, Northwick
Oldbury Naite, Oldbury-on-Severn, Old Down, Oldland, Oldland Common, Old Sodbury, Olveston, Over
Pilning, Pennsylvania, Petty France, Pucklechurch
Rangeworthy, Redwick, Rockhampton, Rudgeway
Severn Beach, Shepperdine, Siston, Soundwell, Staple Hill, Swineford
Tockington, Tormarton, Tortworth, Tytherington
Upton Cheyney
Wapley, Warmley, West Littleton, Westerleigh, Whitfield, Wick, Wickwar, Willsbridge, Winterbourne

Places of interest
Avon Valley Railway
Cribbs Causeway and The Mall
Filton Airfield (With museums for Concorde & the Bristol Aero Collection).
Severn Way
The Severn crossings
Thornbury Castle

Democracy

The Conservatives have held an overall majority on the council since 2015, with the only other majority being held by the Liberal Democrats from 1999 to 2003. In 2012, it became one of the first authorities in the UK to return to a Committee System, abolishing the single party Cabinet, as allowed under the Localism Act. This was later reverted to a leader and cabinet system in 2017 during the Conservative majority, a move which was criticised by Labour and Liberal Democrat councillors.

Under the Boundary Commission proposals, which took effect at the 2010 general election, the authority has been divided between three new constituencies, all lying within the authority boundary. These are:
 Thornbury and Yate (County – 63,320 electorate)
 Filton and Bradley Stoke (County – 62,299 electorate)
 Kingswood (Borough – 60,936 electorate)
County/Borough is a legal term denoting the type of constituency. County is a rural area, Borough is an urban area.

References

External links
 South Gloucestershire Council

 
Politics of South Gloucestershire District
Unitary authority districts of England
Local government districts of South West England